The 1981 New Jersey State Senate elections were held on November 3.

The election coincided with a tightly contested gubernatorial election between Thomas Kean and James Florio. Republicans gained five seats, narrowing the Democratic majority to four.

Background

Redistricting 
As required, the New Jersey legislature reapportioned its state legislative districts in advance of the 1981 election. The new districts resulted in many senators running for re-election in newly re-numbered districts.

ABSCAM scandal 

A Federal Bureau of Investigation investigation resulted in the retirements of Senators Joseph A. Maressa and Angelo Errichetti, both of whom accepted bribes from the FBI under the guise of Arab oil sheikhs. Errichetti was convicted; Maressa was not prosecuted but opted to retire.

Incumbents not running for re-election

Democratic 
 Joseph A. Maressa (District 4)
 Angelo Errichetti (District 5)
 Charles B. Yates (District 7)
 Joseph P. Merlino (District 13) (ran for Governor)
 William J. Hamilton (District 17)
 Frank J. Dodd (District 26)
 James A. Galdieri (District 32)

Republican 
 James Cafiero (District 1)
 Barry T. Parker (District 8) (ran for Governor)
 James Wallwork (District 25) (ran for Governor)

Summary of results by State Senate district

District 1 
The first district consisted of all of Cape May County and the Cumberland municipalities of Vineland, Millville, Bridgeton, Upper Deerfield, Deerfield, and Maurice River. Prior to redistricting, it had contained all of Cumberland County.

Incumbent Senator James Cafiero retired.

 James R. Hurley, Assemblyman from Millville (Republican)
 Edward H. Salmon, Cumberland County Freeholder and former Mayor of Millville (Democratic)

District 2 
The second district consisted of Atlantic County except for the municipalities of Folsom, Buena, and Buena Vista, which were removed in redistricting. Redistricting also removed Bass River and Washington in Burlington County and Tuckerton and Little Egg Harbor in Ocean County.

 Joseph McGahn, former Democratic Senator (Republican)
 Steven Perskie, incumbent Senator since 1978 (Democratic)

District 3

District 4

District 5

District 6

District 7

District 8

District 9

District 10 
All of the new tenth district had previously been contained within the boundaries of the ninth district in Ocean County. It consisted of Lakewood, Brick, and Toms River, and the shore towns of Lavallette, Mantoloking, Bay Head, Seaside Park, Seaside Heights, Ocean Gate, Point Pleasant Beach, and Point Pleasant.

 Hazel Gluck, Assemblywoman from Lakewood (Republican)
 John F. Russo, incumbent Senator since 1974 (Democratic)

District 11

District 12

District 13

District 14

District 15 
Incumbent Senator Joseph Merlino, who had been redistricted from the 13th district, opted to run for Governor of New Jersey.

 Carmen J. Armenti, former mayor of Trenton (Republican)
 Gerald R. Stockman, Assemblyman from Trenton (Democratic)

District 16

District 17

District 18

District 19

District 20

District 21

District 22

District 23

District 24

District 25

District 26

District 27

District 28

District 29

District 30

District 31

District 32

District 33

District 34

District 35

District 36

District 37

District 38

District 39

District 40

References 

1981 New Jersey elections
New Jersey
1981